CDD may refer to:

Entertainment
Cats Don't Dance, a 1997 animated film
Charlottesville Derby Dames, a roller derby league based in Virginia

Medicine and psychology
Childhood disintegrative disorder, a rare condition that causes late-onset developmental delays
Chlorine dioxide disinfection, a process to disinfect water
Concentration deficit disorder, another term for sluggish cognitive tempo
Conserved domain database, a collation of protein structural and functional motifs from several independent databases
Craniodiaphyseal dysplasia, a bone disorder causing calcium build up in the skull

Science
Chlorinated dibenzo-p-dioxin(s), a.k.a. polychlorinated dibenzodioxins
Collaborative Drug Discovery, a private software company with a web-based platform for managing drug discovery data
Comment programming, also known as comment-driven development, a software development technique
Community-driven development, another software development technique
Cooling degree day, a qualitative index used to reflect the demand for energy to cool a business
Custom Debian Distribution, a customized Debian Distribution
Cyclic delay diversity, a diversity scheme used in OFDM-based telecommunication systems

Other uses
Cardenden railway station, a railway station in Scotland
Centre for Democracy and Development, a non-government organization in Africa
Cidade de Deus (Rio de Janeiro), a neighbourhood in Rio de Janeiro, Brazil
Community Development District, a government organization authorized by Florida Statutes
Congregatio Discipulorum Domini, a Catholic order founded in China
Customer Due Diligence, a process to protect financial institutions from money laundering and other risks